The discography of British rapper and songwriter Plan B consists of three studio albums, one soundtrack album, two mixtapes, three extended plays and eighteen singles. Plan B released his first single, the double A-side "Kidz / Dead and Buried" in 2005, as a limited edition 7" vinyl of which only 500 copies were pressed. The parent album, Who Needs Actions When You Got Words, was first released on 26 June 2006 through 679 Recordings—peaking at number thirty on the UK Albums Chart. The album's breakthrough single, "Mama (Loves a Crackhead)", was released in July 2006—marking the musician's first chart appearance, when it peaked at number forty-one in the United Kingdom"

In January 2010, Plan B released the single "Stay Too Long" as the lead single from his second studio album, The Defamation of Strickland Banks. The track saw Plan B attain his first top 10 single; peaking at number nine. Its successor, "She Said", was released in April 2010; attaining European chart success—peaking at number three in the UK, number two in Ireland and number ten in Germany. The album followed the tracks' release on 9 April 2010, debuting at number-one on the UK Albums Chart; having since been certified as triple platinum by the British Phonographic Industry. A further five singles were released from the studio album: "Prayin'", "The Recluse", "Love Goes Down", "Writing's on the Wall" and "Hard Times"—the latter of which featured additional vocals from Elton John and Paloma Faith.

To accompany the release of the film Ill Manors, Plan B released a soundtrack album of the same name on 23 July 2012. The lead single, also entitled "Ill Manors", became his third top ten single—peaking at number six in the United Kingdom. The follow-up singles, "Lost My Way", "Deepest Shame" and "Playing with Fire", all achieved different levels of success, peaking at No. 121, No. 27 and No. 78 respectively.

Albums

Studio albums

Soundtracks

Extended plays
 Live at The Pet Cemetery EP (2006)
 Remixes (2006)
 Time 4 Plan B (2007)
 iTunes Festival: London 2010 (2010)
 iTunes Festival: London 2012 (2012)

Mixtapes
 It's Time 4 Plan B (2006)
 Paint It Blacker: The Bootleg Album (2007)

Singles

Promotional singles

As featured artist

Other certified songs

Music videos

As featured artist

Compilation appearances

Guest appearances

Notes
  "No Good" was re-released as a single in 2007.
  Album version of "Hard Times" did not feature Elton John & Paloma Faith.
  Music videos were also aired for the Hadouken! and Beni G & Brookes Brothers remixes.
  A music video was also aired for the Pendulum remix.
  A re-edited music video was also aired in 2011.
  A music video was also aired for Breakage's Bad Week remix.

See also
 List of songs recorded by Plan B

References

External links
 
 
 
 

Discographies of British artists
Hip hop discographies
Discography